The Best of Chuckie is an two disc greatest hits album by the Surinamese DJ Chuckie, released in 2013. The album peaked at 100 on the Dutch Charts.

Track listing

Charts

References 

2013 greatest hits albums
Electro house albums
Electronic albums